Margaret Marshall may refer to:

Margaret H. Marshall (born 1944), Chief Justice of the Massachusetts Supreme Judicial Court 1999–2010
Margaret Anne Marshall (born 1949), Scottish singer, operatic soprano

See also
Margaret Marshal